Maran-e Olya (also Romanized as Marān-e ‘Olyā and Marrān-e ‘Olyā; also known as Marān-e Bālā and Marrān) is a village in Obatu Rural District, Karaftu District, Divandarreh County, Kurdistan Province, Iran. At the 2006 census, its population was 543, in 124 families. The village is populated by Kurds.

References 

Towns and villages in Divandarreh County
Kurdish settlements in Kurdistan Province